Pteraichnus is an ichnogenus that has been attributed to pterosaurs. It has been found in, among other units, the Lower Jurassic Aztec Sandstone and Lake Ezequiel Ramos Mexia in the Candeleros Formation.

See also
 Timeline of pterosaur research
 Ichnology
 Pterosaur ichnogenera

References

Reptile trace fossils
Candeleros Formation